Jersey is the debut solo extended play by American recording artist Bella Thorne, released on November 17, 2014 by Hollywood Records.

Background
In March 2013, Thorne announced she'd been signed to Hollywood Records, and began working on her debut album. On August 23, 2013, she discussed details about her upcoming album, telling MTV: "What fans can expect is [for it] just to be very different from anyone, because I don't like to be one of those artists where you can be like: 'Oh yeah, I know them from that song.' All my songs are very different from each other. So I don't want to be known as only one genre."

Development
On March 28, 2014, Thorne announced her debut album would be named as the single, and confirmed it will consist of eleven songs. In a Billboard article published on May 2, 2014, it was revealed that the album would be called Call It Whatever, and the release date would be June 24, 2014. Thorne revealed the reason why the album took so long was because "I really wanted to work on my voice. I never sang before, and I didn't want to put an album out that I wasn't proud of, or that was Auto-tuned or anything like that. I waited so that I could take a lot of vocal classes, so that I could work on my voice every day". Thorne described the sound of her album as a mix between R&B and electropop, citing as influences artists like Mariah Carey, Destiny's Child, Usher and Miley Cyrus. In an interview with Access Hollywood, she promoted the project as very feminist.

About her first single, "Call It Whatever", Thorne said she purposely chose a teen pop song to make a connection between her Disney Channel audience and the urban audience that she wanted to reach and this was the album's only teen piece, while her next single would be focused on R&B: "'Call It Whatever' is my youngest-sounding song. This song is definitely for my younger audience. I don't want to eliminate them, but my album is geared a little bit older."

Full album cancellation and EP

However, on October 15, Thorne announced that her full-length debut album would be scrapped in favor of an EP instead and the eleven recorded songs were archived. The following week, Thorne announced the official track list along with a preview of "Paperweight". The EP was released on November 17, with no single released and soon after, Thorne announced her departure from Hollywood Records.

Only in April 2015, Thorne opened up for J-14 about the real reason her album never released: the album didn't sound like imagined and she wasn't happy with the "auto-tuned bad music", so Thorne realized she wouldn't be a great singer and decided to cancel the project.

Promotion
No single was released, only the remix version of "Call It Whatever" was included in Jersey. Thorne promoted the EP for a one time, in the event Shall We Dance on Ice, in Bloomington, Illinois, on December 16, 2014, when she performed "Jersey".

Track listing
On October 28, Thorne posted a picture on her Facebook page from what is possibly behind the scenes of her album cover photoshoot which included the official track list for the EP. Credits taken from Qobuz, except for the title track, taken from APRA AMCOS.

Credits and personnel
Credits adapted from the liner notes of Jersey

Bella Thorne – lead vocals, songwriter
Bobby Brackins – background vocals, songwriter, record producer
Charlotte Aitchison – songwriter
Bebe Rexha – songwriter
Leah Haywood – songwriter
Allan Grigg – songwriter, producer
Par Westerland – songwriter
Daniel James – songwriter
Dreamlab – producer, vocal producer
Ian Kirkpatrick – songwriter, producer
Rickard Göransson – songwriter
Skyler Stonestreet – songwriter

Release history

References

Bella Thorne albums
2014 EPs
Hollywood Records EPs